Adanim is a moshav in central Israel. Located in the Sharon plain near Hod HaSharon, it falls under the jurisdiction of Drom HaSharon Regional Council.

History
The moshav was founded in 1950 by immigrants from Romania on land that had belonged to the depopulated Palestinian village of Biyar 'Adas. It was initially named Yarkona BeHarhava before being renamed after Psalm 36:8(9): "You give them drink from Your river of delights."

References

Moshavim
Populated places established in 1950
Populated places in Central District (Israel)
Romanian-Jewish culture in Israel
1950 establishments in Israel